Zéo is a town in western Ivory Coast. It is a sub-prefecture of Bangolo Department in Guémon Region, Montagnes District.

Zéo was a commune until March 2012, when it became one of 1126 communes nationwide that were abolished.

In 2014, the population of the sub-prefecture of Zéo was 9,259.

Villages
The 9 villages of the sub-prefecture of Zéo and their population in 2014 are:

Notes

Sub-prefectures of Guémon
Former communes of Ivory Coast